Tengku Amir Shah ibni Sultan Sharafuddin Idris Shah (born 12 December 1990) is the current Crown Prince of the Malaysian state of Selangor. He is the son and heir apparent to the current Sultan of Selangor, Sultan Sharafuddin Idris Shah and a member of the Selangor royal family.

Early life
Tengku Amir was born on 12 December 1990 at Pacific Presbyterian Medical Center in San Francisco, as the third child and first son of the then Raja Muda of Selangor, Tengku Idris Shah. His mother, Cik Puan Nur Lisa Idris binti Abdullah (born Lisa Davis), was born in the United States. As such, he has half American ancestry. He has two elder paternal half-sisters, Tengku Zerafina and Tengku Zatashah.

On 3 May 2002, aged 11, Tengku Amir was proclaimed Raja Muda of Selangor. He is formally installed on 8 October 2016 at Istana Alam Shah, Klang.

He received his primary education at Alice Smith School, Kuala Lumpur. He then attended Wellington College in the United Kingdom and graduated in 2009. Tengku Amir graduated from the University of Leeds with a Bachelor's of Science Degree in Ecology and Environmental Biology in 2014.

Military career
In late 2014, pictures of Tengku Amir wearing military uniform were leaked and went viral. It was later confirmed that he was rolling into Officers Cadet School in Port Dickson, Negeri Sembilan to pursue a military career. He enrolled in Royal Military Academy Sandhurst, Camberley, Surrey on 3 May 2015. He attended the Commissioning Course Intake 152 and graduated on 15 April 2016.

Tengku Amir was commissioned as a Second Lieutenant (Leftenan Muda) in the 17th Battalion Royal Malay Regiment (Para), a regiment of the 10th Parachute Brigade in Malaysian Army in a ceremony on 19 July 2016, which was held at Terendak Camp, Malacca. When asked why he chose to join Malaysian Army instead of following his father's footstep by joining Malaysian Navy, he said that he was attracted to the challenge offered by the army which demanded strong physical and mental endurance.

He attended and passed the Basic Rapid Deployment Force Course (APAC) Series 2/2016, which was held from 5 September until 2 October 2016. He is the only member of the royal family who had done so. He received the maroon beret and parachutist badge on 15 March 2017. He was promoted to Lieutenant on 15 April 2017, and later Captain on 19 November 2020 after taking promotion examinations between July and September 2020. However, his rank conferment ceremony was delayed to 8 March 2021 due to the COVID-19 pandemic.

Installation as the Crown Prince of Selangor
Tengku Amir was formally installed as the crown prince in 2016, at the age of 26. His installation ceremony was held in two parts, one week apart.

First part: Taking the oath
The first part of the ceremony was held on 8 October 2016 at the Balairung Seri, Istana Alam Shah, Klang. In the ceremony, he took the oath as Crown Prince in front of his father, the Sultan and the queen consort, Tengku Permaisuri Norashikin. The couple sat at the throne, while Tengku Amir stood at a short distance in front of them, holding the ceremonial long spear. He pledged his allegiance to the Sultan of Selangor and vowed to not inflict any ill will or wrongdoing towards anyone. He also conceded that in the event that he breaches his allegiance and resorts to any wrongdoing, he would face the wrath of his ancestors, the deceased former Sultans, and be prepared to accept retribution from God and the Ruler of Selangor for any wrongdoing.

Tengku Amir also signed the decree witnessed by his uncle, the Tengku Laksamana of Selangor, Tengku Sulaiman Shah, Shah Alam High Court judge, Datuk Mohamad Zabidin Mohd Diah and Selangor state secretary, Datuk Mohd Amin Ahmad Ahya.

Then, Sharafuddin of Selangor presented a royal regalia, the Crown Prince of Selangor's Most Illustrious Kris (Malay: Keris Kebesaran Yang Amat Mulia Raja Muda Selangor) to Tengku Amir, symbolising him being officially installed as the Crown Prince of Selangor.

The ceremony was also attended by his half-sister, Tengku Zatashah and her husband, Aubry Mennesson, and the fellow members of the royal family, the then Defence Minister, Hishammuddin Hussein and wife, Tengku Marsilla Tengku Abdullah, Urban Wellbeing, Housing and Local Government Minister Noh Omar, Menteri Besar of Selangor, Azmin Ali, inspector-general of police, Khalid Abu Bakar, Malaysian Army chief general, Zulkifeli Mohd Zin, Selangor State Executive Council members, state assembly persons and government officers. It ended with prayer led by Selangor mufti, Mohd Tamyes Abdul Wahid. As per tradition, he then set out for a seven days travel outside the state.

Second part: Istiadat Menghadap dan Menjunjung Duli
Tengku Amir returned on the 15 October 2016. The returning ceremony was called Istiadat Menghadap dan Menjunjung Duli (literally: Greet and serve the king ceremony) and was also held at the Balairung Seri, Istana Alam Shah.

The ceremony began with the entrance of the chamberlain, Engku Maharajalela Setia Paduka with the Sultan's royal regalia and the nobat (Royal musical essemble) to the Balairung Seri. It was followed by the entrance of the palace officers; 18 men carrying umbrellas, eight men carrying spears, eight men carrying javelins, four men carrying swords, eight women carrying candlesticks, and eight women who are not carrying anything.

Then, six heralds entered the room, before taking their seat at the left and the right of the isle. Two male heralds and three female heralds were carrying spittoon, tepak sirih (a box for keeping betel leaves), and water tools. Seven nobat members also entered the room.

The ceremony continued with the entrance of Tengku Laksamana Selangor and the sons of the nobles, accompanied by Tengku Paduka Shah Bandar to Balairung Seri. Tengku Paduka Shah Bandar then brought and laid the Quran on the table at the throne accompanied by Tengku Setia.

At 10.00 am the gong was stroke three times to mark the arrival of  Sharafuddin of Selangor and Tengku Permaisuri Norashikin, with the song 'The King's Arrival' played in the background by the nobat. The arrival of the royal couple was followed by the march led by Tengku Laksamana Selangor as Head of the Royal Customs of Selangor, Engku Seri Perdana carrying the kris and Tengku Panglima Besar Selangor.

Shortly after Sultan Sharafuddin and Queen Norashikin were seated on the throne, Tengku Amir walked in Balairung Seri while holding high the kris given by the Sultan earlier in the week. Then, he presented a few souvenir and gifts to his father. After the Sultan accepted his gifts, Tengku Amir kiss his father's hand and took his seat at the Raja Muda throne. The nobat played a song called Anak Raja Bersiram (literally: The king's child shower) during this ceremony.

Azmin Ali, representing the people of Selangor, conveyed his congratulation to the newly installed crown prince. He said, "Chivalry is a common trait that flows in the noble blood that build kingdoms, creating orderly and governing systems in the Malay Archipelago. I, and the people (of Selangor) would like to convey our loyalty to His Royal Highness the Crown Prince of Selangor and renew the pledge of protecting the Constitutional Monarchy." He also expressed that he was impressed with Tengku Amir's personality, his determination while he underwent the military training at the Royal Military Academy Sandhurst and always sparing time with the people in a lot of events including Ihya Ramadan. Azmin was flanked by two members of Selangor State Executive Council, Elizabeth Wong, representing Selangorian-Chinese and V. Ganabatirau representing Selangorian-Indian.

Tengku Amir was also congratulated by Tengku Indera Setia Selangor, Tengku Ahmad Shah Ibni Almarhum Sultan Salahuddin Abdul Aziz Shah, who represented the other heirs and royal family members, and members of the Selangor Council of the Royal Court. Selangor mufti, Datuk Mohd Tamyes Abdul Wahid again led the prayer at the end of the ceremony.

Royal duties
One of his official duties include welcoming the newly elected Yang di-Pertuan Agong upon their arrival at Kuala Lumpur International Airport (KLIA) for their oath swearing ceremony. This is because despite its name, the airport is located in Sepang, which is in Selangor.

He welcomed the arrival of Muhammad V of Kelantan on 13 December 2016 upon his arrival at Kompleks Bunga Raya, KLIA. Muhammad V took a flight from Kota Bharu, Kelantan for his swearing in ceremony as the fifteenth Yang-di Pertuan Agong. He also welcomed the arrival of Abdullah of Pahang and his queen consort, Tunku Azizah Aminah Maimunah for the Sultan's oath swearing ceremony as the sixteenth Yang di-Pertuan Agong when they arrived at KLIA on 31 January 2019, after taking a flight from Kuantan, Pahang.

Tengku Amir attended the 2018 Warrior's Day celebration in Selangor with his father at Selangor Memorial Monument on 31 July 2018. He lay wreaths and pay homage to Malaysian fallen heroes during the event.

He made official visits to different area of Selangor as part of his duties as Raja Muda Selangor. In March 2019, he visited the district Kuala Langat with several members of Selangor royal family for three days. There, he visited a few landmarks such as Muzium Insitu, Mount Jugra and Istana Bandar. He also climbed Mount Nuang and officiated the re-opening of its hiking track. On 11 September 2019, he visited the district Sabak Bernam for three days, making stops at local attraction such as the beach at Bagan Nakhoda Omar and paddy field at Parit 14 Sungai Panjang among others.

Tengku Amir is a  Pro-chancellor of Universiti Putra Malaysia since 18 October 2021.

Involvement in sports
Tengku Amir founded the amateur football competition, Selangor Champions League in 2016.

He is also well known to be a sports lover and enjoys playing golf and cycling among other things. He joined a 25 kilometers cycling program, Selangor Industrial Ride 1.0 on 30 July 2017. He also led the Selangor leg of the Kuala Lumpur torch run leading up to 2017 Southeast Asian Games. He joined a run to celebrate the opening of the third bridge of Klang on 17 December 2017. He participated in the "Family Fun Run" category, which involved running for five kilometres along the Raja Muda Nala bridge.

On 18 August 2019, he joined Shah Alam International Enduride, a 155 kilometers relaxing cycling program.

Selangor F.C.
Tengku Amir Shah is the royal patron of the football club, Selangor F.C. .

After facing four consecutive defeats in August 2016, the head coach of F.A. Selangor at the time, Zainal Abidin Hassan was fired from his position. An internal conflict arose in the football club management between the club president, Azmin Ali, who was also the Menteri Besar of Selangor, and the exco members regarding the compensation payment for the leaving coach, and the amount of money the Government of Selangor should allocate to the football club. The supporters of the club pushed for the president to resign, and voiced their support for Tengku Amir to take over as the club president.

On 23 December 2016, Tengku Amir made a statement on his instagram account, suggesting for F.A. Selangor to be revamped and for executive committee (EXCO) members who are involved in politics to step down from their post. On 30 December 2016, Azmin resigned from his position as the club president, stated that he "had made the decision to part ways with an organisation and management that is not authoritative and not committed to change for the sake of [returning] the glory of Selangor state football."

In another Instagram post posted in February 2017, Tengku Amir outlined seven steps that can be taken to revamp and rejuvenate the football team. In the statement, he also mentioned that although he was flattered by the support received by him from the people to take over F.A. Selangor, he believed that FAS requires someone with more experience to lead the body. Subsequently, Subahan Kamal was unanimously voted as the new president in an extraordinary congress held on 23 February 2017. In an interview in March 2017, Tengku Amir stated that for the time being, he will remain as the royal patron of the football club. He cited his reason as that he was currently involved in a project called Football Selangor, where he is focusing on building the football community by introducing social leagues and community leagues through Selangor Youth Community. On 31 May 2018, the departing club president, Subahan Kamal confirmed that Tengku Amir will replace him as the football association's president after he left the sports body. He officially became the president of F.A. Selangor after receiving 81 nominations from 96 affiliates and won uncontested in the extraordinary congress that was held on 3 July 2018. He stated that his goal as the new president is to make F.A. Selangor self-sustaining and become a commercially viable club. He aimed for the club to be able to not rely on state funding in five years.

On 3 November 2018, a group of individuals called an Extraordinary Congress (EC) to elect new executive committee, citing that the appointment of several committee members are not lawful, including the position of several vice-presidents. The subsequent re-election showed total change in all posts, barring Tengku Amir who was re-elected as the president. However, Tengku Amir later declared that the EC was invalid since it does not followed the proper procedure. It was also held without his consent and was not recognised by him and the association. This was supported by the Football Association of Malaysia president, Hamidin Mohd Amin, who said that Tengku Amir is still the president of FAS and the congress was invalid as it was held without the president's consent. Tengku Amir called the rogue faction to meet him at the palace to voice out their displeasure but only less than half of them attended it. As a result, he removed 43 affiliate clubs from the association, stating that they no longer hold the same values and dreams as F.A. Selangor. The announcement was made through FAS social media accounts on 15 December 2018.

Under his leadership, the football club underwent moderate transformation, such as the introduction of membership team cards and season passes to the club supporters in 2019. On 24 July 2019, he launched the opening of the new training centre and office complex, located at SUK Sports Complex, Section 5, Shah Alam. He launched the FAS Soccer School program on 29 September 2019. The program which involved five primary schools in Selangor is responsible for providing skilled coaches services, coaching courses, football equipment and games opportunities to students involved.

F.A. Selangor was privatised and renamed as Selangor F.C. on 2 October 2020. It is owned by Red Giants F.C. Sdn. Bhd., with Tengku Amir as the largest shareholder of the company.

Social interests

Philanthropy and charity
Tengku Amir is a patron of a few charitable organisations, including Cheshire Home and the Raja Muda of Selangor Foundation (Yayasan Raja Muda Selangor) since 2003.

Selangor Youth Community (SAY)
Selangor Youth Community is a non-government organisation founded by Tengku Amir. In an exclusive interview with Berita Harian, the crown prince stated that he started the program as an initiative to approach the youth in Selangor and discover their interest.

On 20 November 2018, Tengku Amir launched SAY Ignite, a festival that aimed to celebrate and ignite youths through creative content and social activities such as debate, art showcase, kayak race, introduction to sailing classes, football, poetry recital and forums. It was held at Taman Tasik Shah Alam.

Titles, styles and honours
Tengku Amir's style and title is:
 In Malay: Duli Yang Teramat Mulia Tengku Amir Shah Ibni Sultan Sharafuddin Idris Shah Alhaj
 In English: His Highness Tengku Amir Shah Ibni Sultan Sharafuddin Idris Shah Alhaj

Military ranks

  3 May 2015: Officer Cadet

  16 April 2016: Second Lieutenant, Malaysian Army
  19 July 2016: Attached to 17th Battalion Royal Malay Regiment (PARA)
  15 April 2017: Lieutenant, 17th Battalion Royal Malay Regiment (PARA)
  19 November 2020: Captain, 17th Battalion Royal Malay Regiment (PARA)

Honours

Honours of Selangor 

  Sultan Salahuddin Silver Jubilee Medal (1990)
  Sultan Salahuddin Coronation Medal (1990)
  Sultan Sharafuddin Coronation Medal First Class in gold (2003)
  Knight Grand Commander of the Order of the Crown of Selangor (SPMS) — Dato' Seri (2005) 
  Knight Grand Companion of the Order of Sultan Sharafuddin Idris Shah (SSIS) — Dato’ Setia (2010)
  First Class of the Royal Family Order of Selangor (DK I) (2016)

Honours of Malaysia 
  :
  Sultan Salahuddin Yang di-Pertuan Agong Installation Medal (26 April 1999)
  : 
  Knight Grand Commander of the Order of the Crown of Kelantan or "Star of Muhammad" (SPMK) - Dato' (5 January 2011)

Ancestry
He was eligible for United States citizenship since he was born in the United States but since Malaysia does not allow dual citizenship, he is not an American.

References

External links

|-

1990 births
Living people
Royal House of Selangor
First Classes of Royal Family Order of Selangor
Malaysian people of Malay descent
Malaysian people of Bugis descent
Malaysian people of American descent
People from San Francisco
American people of Bugis descent
American people of Malay descent
American people of Malaysian descent
American Muslims
Citizens of Malaysia through descent
Malaysian Muslims
Heirs apparent
Knights Grand Commander of the Order of the Crown of Selangor
Alumni of the University of Leeds
Sons of monarchs